JBHS may refer to:

 Bowie High School (Arlington, Texas), in Arlington, Texas
 Bowie High School (Austin, Texas), in Austin, Texas
 Jack Britt High School, in Cumberland County, North Carolina
 Jensen Beach High School, in Jensen Beach, Florida
 Joel Barlow High School, in Redding, Connecticut
 John Burroughs High School, in Burbank, California

See also 

 Bowie High School (disambiguation), several high schools of that name